The 2019 Sheikh Kamal International Club Cup, also known as Sheikh Kamal Gold Cup 2019, was the 3rd edition of Sheikh Kamal International Club Cup, an international club football tournament hosted by the Chittagong Abahani in association with the Bangladesh Football Federation. This tournament will take place at the M. A. Aziz Stadium in the port city of Chittagong from 19 October to 30 October 2019. Participation fees for each team are US$10,000 and the champion of the tournament will be awarded US$50,000 and the runner-up will be awarded US$25,000.

Terengganu are the current trophy holder. They defeated Chittagong Abahani by 2–1 on 31 October 2019.

Participating teams 
Eight clubs sent their team to participate in the tournament from five nations of AFC. Two teams from Bangladesh, three teams from India, and one team each from Laos, Malaysia and Maldives participated.

Following are the participated teams:
 Chittagong Abahani (Host)
 Bashundhara Kings
 Mohun Bagan
 Chennai City
 Gokulam Kerala
 Terengganu
 TC Sports Club
 Young Elephants

Draw
The draw were held on 11 October 2019 in Dhaka. The eight teams were divided into 2 groups. The top 2 teams from each group will qualify for Semi-finals.

Group draw

Venue

Group stages
 All Matches will be played at Chittagong
Times Listed are UTC+6:00

Group A

Group B

Knockout stage
 Time listed are UTC+6:00
 All matches played at Chittagong
 In the knockout stage, extra time and penalty shoot-out are used to decide the winner if necessary.

Bracket

Semi-finals

Final

Winners

Goalscorers

Prize money

Media coverage

Bangladeshi satellite channels Channel 9, Bangla TV & Bangladesh Television live telecasted all matches in Bangladesh and South Asian countries as well as rest of the world.
Online stream: Cplustv YouTube channel https://www.youtube.com/channel/UC3aNZXndc9tRpYKYKSYUbrg
Bangladesh Betar 104.0 FM telecasted live commentary all matches from the  stadium.
Print media partners are The Daily Star also The Bonik Barta.

References

Sheikh Kamal International Club Cup
Sheikh Kamal International Club Cup